A boxcab, in railroad terminology, is a locomotive in which the machinery and crew areas are enclosed in a box-like superstructure (from boxcar).  It is a term mostly used in North America while in Victoria (Australia), such locomotives have been nicknamed "butterboxes" (Victorian Railways second series "E" Class electric locomotives numbered E1102 to E1111).  Boxcabs may use any source of power but most are diesel or electric locomotives.  Few steam locomotives are so described but the British SR Leader class was a possible exception. Most American boxcabs date from before World War II, when the earliest boxcabs were often termed "oil-electrics" to avoid the use of the German name "Diesel" due to propaganda purposes.

Styling
Boxcabs do not have heavily styled ends, or a superstructure consisting of multiple boxy structures, although the prototype diesel/oil-electric, GE #8835, had one prominently-rounded nose (from its trolley (tram) car ancestry) and the second and following 100-ton ALCO boxcabs had semi-cylindrical ends.

Australia
The construction of double-ended (and a small number of single-ended) boxcab diesel locomotives was common in Australia from 1969 until the 1980s. These were mainly GM-EMD derivatives built by Clyde Engineering with a smaller number of Alco derivatives built by AE Goodwin/Commonwealth Engineering and GE derivatives by A Goninan & Co/UGL Rail.

Great Britain

Most British diesel and electric locomotives are boxcabs, although the term "boxcab" is not used in Britain.  Instead, locomotives are referred to by their TOPS class numbers, e.g. British Rail Class 47 and British Rail Class 92.  British diesel and electric locomotives are nearly always double-ended (i.e. there is a driving cab at each end). Other double-cab designs, with a cab that is wider than a narrower engine compartment, include the British Rail Class 58 and British Rail Class 70, but they do not classify as boxcabs.

Elsewhere
In post-Soviet Eastern Europe, diesel and electric locomotives with a boxcab configuration are common. Notable examples are the diesel TE10 and 2TE25A, and the electric VL23 (ru). In Sweden, the electric SJ Rb and Rc locomotives have a near-perfect box shape which would inspire derivatives such as the American EMD AEM-7. In historic East and West Germany, the first electric locomotives such as the DRG Class E 77 and the E 91 has this configuration, although there are more recent locomotives such as the DB Class 151 and 155 which have the same shape.

Several locomotives of this configuration can be found in Asia although these terms are not used. In China, there are many diesel locomotives that use this classification such as the first generation DF8, ND2 and the NJ2. In Japan, most of its earlier electric locomotives have this body type such as the JNR Classes EF60 to EF65. In Thailand, almost all diesel locomotives are cab-forward, and some locomotives have a boxcab shape. An example of this configuration used by the State Railway of Thailand would be the Alsthom AD42C. In the Philippines, ten Bo'Bo'Bo Danseuses-type 1500 class diesel locomotives were ordered from Alsthom to serve in Luzon in 1966. However, they were retired after only 10 years in service due to cab confusion that led to an accident in Albay and the last unit was scrapped in 1989. Pakistan Railways also ran boxcab electric locomotives until 2011 with the BCU30.

In South Africa, while diesel locomotives follow the hood unit style since their inception, electric locomotives has consistently followed this configuration since 1947 with the introduction of the South African Class 3E. The first electrics (the ES1) had a steeplecab shape while later locomotives had a pentagonal shape. The electrics also feature a door in front of the locomotive with the exception of the 12E, similar to the Japanese JNR-era ones. Older locos have their doors at the center while newer ones starting with 14E feature a door at the left-hand side (right-hand from the observer's perspective) of the train.

See also

 ALCO boxcab
 Box motor
 GE boxcab
 GE three-power boxcab
 GE 57-ton gas-electric boxcab

References

Locomotive body styles